Lawrence Roberts may refer to:
Lawrence Roberts (scientist) (1937–2018), one of the "fathers" of the Internet
Lawrence Roberts (basketball) (born 1982), American professional basketball player
Lawrence Roberts (politician) (born 1941), Pennsylvania politician
Lawrence E. Roberts (1922–2004), pilot with the Tuskegee Airmen
Larry Roberts (actor) (1926–1992), American actor
Larry Roberts (American football) (1963–2016), American football player
Lawrence Roberts (athlete) (1903–1977), South African track and field athlete
Lawrence Roberts (footballer), Scottish footballer